Glutaryl chloride or pentanedioyl dichloride is an organic compound with the formula C5H6Cl2O2, or (CH2)3(COCl)2. It is the diacid chloride derivative of glutaric acid. It is a colorless liquid although commercial samples can appear darker.

References

External links 
 MSDS Safety data (PDF)

Acyl chlorides